Simmons Basin is an ice-free basin, or valley, trending southeast between Solitary Rocks and Friis Hills, marginal to the north side of the bend of Taylor Glacier in Victoria Land. The lower east end of the valley is occupied by Simmons Lake and a lobe of ice from Taylor Glacier. Named by Advisory Committee on Antarctic Names (US-ACAN) in 1992 after George M. Simmons, Jr., biologist, Virginia Polytechnic Institute and State University, who in the decade following 1977, led several United States Antarctic Research Program (USARP) teams in the study of Lakes Bonney, Fryxell, Hoare, Vanda, and other lakes of the McMurdo Dry Valleys.

Valleys of Victoria Land
McMurdo Dry Valleys